Mayho is a surname. Notable people with this surname include:

 Dominique Mayho (born 1993), Bermudian cyclist
 Hannah Mayho (born 1990), English cyclist
 Jessica Mayho (born 1993), English athlete